András Gál (born 20 May 1989, in Budapest) is a Hungarian football player who plays for Austrian club SV Petzenkirchen.

Club statistics

Updated to games played as of 2 June 2013.

External links
 http://www.UEFA.com
 Hungarian Football Federation
 András Gál at ÖFB

1989 births
Living people
Footballers from Budapest
Hungarian footballers
Hungarian expatriate footballers
Association football defenders
MTK Budapest FC players
BFC Siófok players
Nemzeti Bajnokság I players
Hungarian expatriate sportspeople in Austria
Expatriate footballers in Austria